Hill N Dale is a neighborhood in southwestern Lexington, Kentucky, United States. Its boundaries are Southview Drive to the west, RJ Corman railroad tracks to the east, Southland Drive to the north, and Pasadena Drive to the south.

Neighborhood statistics
 Area: 
 Population: 988
 Population density: 2,982 people per square mile
 Median household income: $54,584

External links
 http://www.city-data.com/neighborhood/Hill-N-Dale-Lexington-KY.html

Neighborhoods in Lexington, Kentucky